Huddersfield Town's 1998–99 campaign was Town's full season with Peter Jackson at the helm. At the end of the season, Town finished a respectable 10th place, but within a day of the end of the season, owner Barry Rubery sacked Peter Jackson to the shock of just about every Huddersfield Town fan.

Squad at the start of the season

Review
Among the summer transfers brought in by manager Peter Jackson was Belgian goalkeeper Nico Vaesen, who was sent off on his debut after just 9 minutes against Bury, but after that made some exceptional performances in the Town net, which helped Town reach top spot in September and October. During that time, Town played Sunderland, which at the time saw a record 20,241 at a match at the McAlpine Stadium. (That would be eclipsed by the 21,629 that saw Town play Derby County in the FA Cup 5th round in February.)

Jackson recruited winger Ben Thornley (a popular loan signing under Horton) from Manchester United and in September, they beat Tranmere Rovers to top the early Division 1 table, thanks chiefly to the goalscoring prowess of Stewart and Allison. 

Even though Town were top of the table, their away form was very mediocre at best. This was probably proven by their 7–1 loss to Barnsley in November (They were 6–0 down at half-time and to make matters worse the game was shown on Sky Sports!) Town did however have a good run in the FA Cup which culminated in a 5th round match against Premier League side Derby County. They eventually lost 3–1 in the replay at Pride Park.

The team attracted the attention of local businessman Barry Rubery and, after protracted takeover talks, he took over the running of the club promising significant investment as the club sought Premiership status. The takeover rumours had a negative effect on the side and they fell away from the promotion race despite Jackson investing in the likes of Craig Armstrong and Jamie Vincent. A play-off place eventually faded following a horrible end to the season, which saw them win only one of their last 11 matches, although that was a 3–2 win against local rivals Bradford City at Valley Parade. 

Jackson was hoping to mount a promotion challenge the following season, but he was suddenly sacked after the end of the season and replaced by former Manchester United captain Steve Bruce, whose first season in management with Sheffield United had brought little success.  Jackson declined the role of academy director.

Squad at the end of the season

Results

Division One

FA Cup

League Cup

Appearances and goals

1998-99
Hudd